O Menino no Espelho (The Boy in the Mirror) is a 2014 Brazilian fantasy adventure drama film directed by Guilherme Fiúza Zenha, based on the book of the same name by Fernando Sabino. The film stars Lino Facioli, Laura Neiva, Mateus Solano and Regiane Alves.

Plot
Fernando is a kid who lives all his fantasies in an intense way and with a lot of imagination. He knows how to "fly" just like birds, living "adventures in the jungle", he builds planes and face the bullies from his school. Together with his friend Mariana and his dog Capeto, he commands a secret society and solves great mysteries like "a haunted house".

But Fernando is never satisfied and always looking to have more free time for his adventures. He wants to have a double someone who would definitely release all his troubles. His reflection in the mirror ends up becoming real just like magic. Odnanref, the mirror double, blindly obeys the wishes of Fernando, assuming his identity whenever he asks. Fernando goes on to live a dream life, the way he always wanted. But something happens when Cìntia, the older cousin of Fernando, arrives in town. Now he will have to resort to his true friends to make Odnanref return to the world of mirrors and thus regain control of his life.

Cast
Lino Facioli as Fernando / Odnanref
Mateus Solano as Domingos
Regiane Alves as Odete
Laura Neiva as Cíntia
Giovanna Rispoli as Mariana 
Ricardo Blat as Major Pape Faria
Gisele Fróes as Teacher
Murilo Grossi

References

External links
 

2014 films
Brazilian fantasy adventure films
Brazilian drama films
Films based on Brazilian novels
2010s fantasy adventure films
2014 fantasy films